Christian Hansen is a Canadian musical band from Edmonton formed in late 2007 and consisting of Christian Hansen and Molly Flood.

History

Early years
In 2006, Christian Hansen, who moved from Vancouver to Edmonton in 2001, released the solo record The Super Awkward Album. A year later, with his fiancee, Molly Flood, and another couple, Scott Shpeley and Ava Jane Markus, they began performing as Christian Hansen and The Autistics. They built up a local following in Edmonton, before beginning a cross-Canada tour and gaining airplay on CBC Radio.

Power Leopard
In March 2009, the group was awarded a $10,000 development grant for Edmonton artists from Rawlco Radio (Rawlco Communications) and used it to record their first full-length album, Power Leopard, released the same year. Power Leopard was produced and recorded by Doug Organ of Edmontone Studio and gained recognition with the singles "Cocaine Trade" and "Pump It", which were put into rotation on Edmonton's Sonic 102.9FM (CHDI-FM) and XM Satellite Radio. Power Leopard reached number 5 on Megatunes' Top 30 record sales for the week of September 10, 2009. A four-song EP, Swans, was released on June 4, 2010, and that year, the band played Calgary's Sled Island Music and Arts Festival, New Music West, the Boonstock Music Festival in Penticton, and the North by Northeast (NXNE) festival in Toronto.

Relocation and second album
Hansen and Flood relocated the band to Toronto in 2011. Their live lineup changed in spring of 2011, with the addition of Doug Organ on drums and Doug Hoyer on bass. In April 2012, due to the change in musical style and personnel, the band officially shortened their name to just Christian Hansen.

In October 2012, they released their second full-length album, C'mon Arizona. 2012 also saw the addition of Dustin Hawthorne (formerly of Hot Hot Heat) on bass and Al Boyle (of You Say Party) on drums.

Name controversy
The band's name has been a controversial topic, though the group has claimed that rather than mocking it, they are paying homage to autism and the people affected by it. In 2009, Hansen told an interviewer, "People have thought that we're making fun of autistic people, but nothing could be further from the truth. The name is an absolute tribute."

Band members
Current members
 Christian Hansen – vocals, guitar
 Molly Flood – keyboards, vocals

Past members
 Scott Shpeley – bass
 Ava Jane Markus – keyboards

Touring musicians
 Doug Organ – drums
 Doug Hoyer – bass
 Dustin Hawthorne – bass
 Al Boyle – drums

Discography
Studio albums
 Power Leopard (2009)
 C'mon Arizona (2012)

EPs
 Power Leopard (2008)
 Swans (2010)
 Small Fry (2014)

References

External links
 

2007 establishments in Alberta
Autism activists
Canadian dance music groups
Musical groups established in 2007
Musical groups from Edmonton